Pseudotapnia curticornis is a species of beetle in the family Cerambycidae, and the only species in the genus Pseudotapnia. It was described by Chemsak and Linsley in 1978.

References

Acanthoderini
Beetles described in 1978
Monotypic beetle genera